Lars Harms (born 13 September 1977 in Basel) is a Swiss former professional squash player. He reached a career-high world ranking of 41 in September 2002.

References

1977 births
Living people
Swiss male squash players
Sportspeople from Basel-Stadt